Colby David Bishop (born 4 November 1996) is an English professional footballer who plays as a forward for  club Portsmouth.

Early life
Bishop was born in Nottingham, Nottinghamshire.

Career

Early career
Bishop signed his first professional contract with Notts County in November 2014. He made his first team debut for the "Magpies" in a 1–0 defeat to Milton Keynes Dons at Meadow Lane on 26 December, he was replaced by Elliott Whitehouse after 73 minutes. In May 2017 he was signed by National League North side Leamington.

Accrington Stanley
On 13 July 2019, Bishop joined Accrington Stanley of League One for an undisclosed fee. He made his debut for the club on the opening day of the season, playing the duration of a 2–0 defeat at Lincoln City, before he scored his first goal for the club in his second appearance, equalising from the penalty spot as Accrington were knocked out of the EFL Cup by Sunderland in an eventual 3–1 defeat.

Portsmouth
On 21 July 2022, Bishop signed for League One club Portsmouth for an undisclosed fee on a three-year contract, with an option to extend for a further year.

Career statistics

References

External links
Profile at the Portsmouth F.C. website

1996 births
Living people
Footballers from Nottingham
English footballers
Association football forwards
Notts County F.C. players
Gloucester City A.F.C. players
Worcester City F.C. players
Boston United F.C. players
Leamington F.C. players
Accrington Stanley F.C. players
Portsmouth F.C. players
English Football League players
National League (English football) players